Kutlug-Tepe is an archaeological mine site in the north of Afghanistan , in ancient Bactria.

Kutlug-Tepe is a reinforcement from the first millennium BC. At the time of the Achaemenid Empire in Bactria province. It is about a kilometer away from the remains of a village and entails a hill that is 40 × 40 meters large and 4-meter-high. The building is round and has three outer walls which the spaces between form two galleries or corridors. The walls have openings to light the galleries and were once vaulted. In the two inner walls there is a passage and on the east side of the outer wall there is a rounded tower. It has a round courtyard inside of its facility in which stands a rectangular building. The building is poorly maintained but has an altar that indicates the whole complex is a temple and not a fortress.

Literature 
Viktor Sarianidi: The Art of Old Afghanistan, Leipzig 1986, pp. 72–75 ISBN 3-527-17561-X

References 

Archaeological sites in Afghanistan
Archaeological sites in Asia
Geography of Balkh Province